Luiz Tadeu Razia Filho (born 4 April 1989) is a Brazilian businessman and former racing driver.

Career

Early career
Razia began his single seater career in 2005 in the South American Formula 3 championship. Driving for Dragão Motorsport, Razia finished sixth in the championship taking six podium finishes, including two race wins. During the season he also took part in the Brazilian Formula Renault 2.0 series, finishing the year tenth in the standings.

For 2006, Razia remained in South American Formula 3, taking eleven podium places and seven race wins to win the title ahead of Mario Moraes and Diego Nunes. He also contested three races in the Formula 3000 International Masters series for Charouz Racing, winning all three of them to finish eighth in the championship. He also became a rookie driver for A1 Team Brazil in the 2006–07 A1 Grand Prix season.

The following year, Razia moved to Europe to race in the Euroseries 3000 championship. He began the season with Fisichella Motor Sport, but made a mid-season change to ELK Motorsport following the departure of Alx Danielsson. During the season, he took four podium places to finish third in the Euroseries standings and fourth in the Italian championship, which ran as part of the main series. Razia also contested four races in the World Series by Renault when he replaced Ricardo Risatti at GD Racing.

In 2008, he remained in Euroseries 3000 with ELK Motorsport, partnering Frenchman Nicolas Prost, the son of four-time Formula One World Champion Alain Prost. In the Italian Formula 3000 standings he once again finished the season in fourth place, taking three podiums including his first race win at Misano.

Towards the end of 2006, Razia tested a GP2 car at Jerez for the Racing Engineering team, and in September 2008 he tested again for the team at the Paul Ricard circuit in Southern France. On 2 October 2008 Razia joined the Trust Team Arden for the 2008–09 GP2 Asia Series season. He scored his first championship points in Qatar, with an 8th in the feature race and a 6th in the sprint race. In the final race of the season in Bahrain, Luiz claimed his first win, having started from the pole – due to the series' reverse-grid system – as he had finished 8th in the feature race the day before.

He signed for Fisichella Motor Sport to compete in the main GP2 Series in 2009. After taking his first point at Autodromo Nazionale Monza during the feature race, Razia led from pole to take his first GP2 win, in a similar way to his win in Bahrain during GP2 Asia.

Razia joined Max Chilton in the Barwa Addax Team for the 2009–10 GP2 Asia Series season, but both drivers were replaced before the second round of the championship, with Chilton moving to Ocean Racing Technology. Razia returned for the final round in Bahrain, replacing Daniel Zampieri at the Rapax Team.

He remained with Rapax for the 2010 GP2 Series season. He started strongly, finishing the first six races in the points (including two podiums), but then endured a barren run until the final round of the season, eventually finishing eleventh in the drivers' championship. His team-mate, Pastor Maldonado, became the series champion, whilst Razia helped Rapax to claim the teams' title.

As part of his Formula One testing deal with the Lotus team, Razia signed to drive for the new AirAsia team in 2011, alongside fellow Lotus tester Davide Valsecchi. He scored no points in the Asia series, but finished sixth in the first race of the main series season, to earn the team three points in its inaugural main series start. He later took his first series pole position at the Hungaroring, and finished 12th in the championship.

For the 2012 season, he moved to the Arden International team alongside Simon Trummer, and won the feature race in Malaysia to lead the championship after the first round of the championship. Davide Valsecchi then moved ahead, but Razia retook the lead by winning the Silverstone sprint race, having also won in Catalunya and Valencia. However, Valsecchi edged back in front over the course of the remainder of the season, and Razia ultimately had to settle for the runner-up position in the championship.

Formula One

Testing role (2010—2012)
Razia drove the car during the Young Drivers' Test at the end of the season, but did not participate in any sessions at Grands Prix. He took part in the first Free Practice session of the 2011 Chinese Grand Prix, and once again in the Young Driver test at the end of the 2011 season.

Marussia (2013)
Razia was set to make his competitive debut at the 2013 Australian Grand Prix, driving for Marussia, however he had issues with his funding and his contract was terminated. He was replaced by Jules Bianchi.

Indy Lights

In 2014, Razia raced in Indy Lights for Schmidt Peterson Motorsports. He scored one win and five podiums, finishing fifth in the overall standings.

Brazil

Razia competed as a guest driver in round 1 of the 2015 Stock Car Brasil, partnering with Lucas Foresti. Later he drove a Toyota Corolla at the Brasileiro de Marcas for Bassani.

Racing record

Career summary

† As Razia was a guest driver, he was ineligible for points.

Complete Formula Renault 3.5 Series results
(key) (Races in bold indicate pole position) (Races in italics indicate fastest lap)

Complete GP2 Series results
(key) (Races in bold indicate pole position) (Races in italics indicate fastest lap)

Complete GP2 Asia Series results
(key) (Races in bold indicate pole position) (Races in italics indicate fastest lap)

Complete GP2 Final results
(key) (Races in bold indicate pole position) (Races in italics indicate fastest lap)

Complete Formula One participations
(key) (Races in bold indicate pole position) (Races in italics indicate fastest lap)

American open-wheel racing results
(key)  (Races in bold indicate pole position) (Races in italics indicate fastest lap)

Indy Lights

References

External links

 

1989 births
Living people
Sportspeople from Bahia
Auto GP drivers
Formula 3 Sudamericana drivers
Brazilian Formula Renault 2.0 drivers
A1 Grand Prix Rookie drivers
GP2 Series drivers
Brazilian GP2 Series drivers
GP2 Asia Series drivers
World Series Formula V8 3.5 drivers
International GT Open drivers
Indy Lights drivers
Stock Car Brasil drivers
Charouz Racing System drivers
Arden International drivers
Scuderia Coloni drivers
Campos Racing drivers
Rapax Team drivers
Caterham Racing drivers
Arrow McLaren SP drivers
Bhaitech drivers
Team West-Tec drivers